Louis-Augustin Marmottin (March 11, 1875 at La Neuville-au-Pont (Marne) – May 9, 1960 at Reims (Marne)) was a French Catholic bishop. He was Bishop of Saint-Dié from 1930 to 1940 and then Archbishop of Reims from 1940 to 1960.

Formation 

Louis-Augustin Marmottin was from a family of farmers of Marne. He completed secondary school studies at Saint-Étienne de Châlons-sur-Marne and then attended the grand seminary. He pursued higher studies at the Institut catholique de Paris from 1896 to 1898 and obtained a license in mathematics and a license in law.

Priest 

Louis-Augustin Marmottin was ordained a priest December 17, 1898 for the Diocese of Châlons.

Bishop of Saint-Dié 

In 1930, Louis-Augustin Marmottin was named Bishop of the Diocese of Saint-Dié. He was ordained in the Cathedral Saint-Étienne de Châlons on October 20, 1930.

He obtained from Pope Pius XI the title of minor basilica for the Church of Saint-Maurice d'Epinal in 1933 and for the Church of Sainte-Jeanne d'Arc du Bois-Chenu in Domrémy-la-Pucelle in 1939.

Archbishop of Reims 

He was named Archbishop of Reims on August 21, 1940 and took possession of the see on October 13, 1940.

He died May 9, 1960 after a long sickness and was interred in Reims Cathedral on 13.

See also 
 Diocese of Saint-Dié
 Archdiocese of Reims
 Archbishops of Reims

Sources 
 Ronsin, Albert, Les Vosgiens célèbres – Dictionnaire biographique illustré, Éditions Gérard Louis, Vagney, 1990, .
 Lévêque, Louis, Petite histoire religieuse des Vosges, Mirecourt, 1949, .
 Vie diocésaine de Saint-Dié, 1960, .

External links 
 Entry at catholic-hierarchy.org

1875 births
1960 deaths
Bishops of Saint-Dié
Archbishops of Reims
20th-century Roman Catholic bishops in France